The Dells Sing Dionne Warwicke’s Greatest Hits  is an album by the vocal group The Dells consisting of music written by Burt Bacharach & Hal David and originally performed by Dionne Warwick.

Reissue summary
From Dusty Groove:
Chess Records takes on the music of Burt Bacharach, with amazing results – thanks to deep soul vocals from The Dells and impeccable production from the legendary Charles Stepney!  The album’s a tremendous meeting of the minds, as The Dells really transform Bacharach’s brilliant compositions – giving them depth and feeling in ways that are quite different from any other renditions of the songs.  The arrangements by Stepney are incredible too – on a par with his famous work for Minnie Riperton, Rotary Connection, and Ramsey Lewis – as majestic as Burt Bacharach might have wanted, but with a very different approach, and a slight undercurrent of funk.  Instrumentation is by Stepney, Phil Upchurch, and members of The Pharaohs – plus a full string section as well.  Another baroque soul classic from the glory days of the Chicago soul scene!

Track listing
 All songs written by Burt Bacharach and Hal David.

Personnel
The Dells
Marvin Junior (baritone)
Johnny Carter (tenor)
Verne Allison (tenor)
Mickey McGill (baritone)
Chuck Barksdale (bass)

Additional musicians
Charles Stepney – Fender Rhodes, piano, harpsichord, congas, percussion
Phil Upchurch & Roland Faulkner – guitar
Cash McCall – guitar (on I Just Don’t Know)
Art Hoyle & Robert Lewis – trumpets
Ed Druzinsky – harp
Ether Merker & Paul Ondracek - horns
Morris Jennings & Donny Simmons – drums
Bobby Christian – percussion
Derf Reklaw, Ealee Satterfield, & Oye Bisi Nalls – bongos & congas

Technical personnel
Arrangements, supervision, & production – Charles Stepney
Engineers – Gary Starr, Roger Anfinsen, Brian Christian
Album Coordination – Mia Krinsky
Production Supervision – Bob Scerbo

References

1972 albums
Funk albums by American artists
Albums arranged by Charles Stepney
Albums produced by Charles Stepney
Cadet Records albums
The Dells albums